This is a list of rivers in the island country of Saint Lucia. Rivers are listed in clockwise order, starting at the north end of the island.

Rivers
There are 180 streams in Saint Lucia. Most of the rivers empty into the Atlantic Ocean or Caribbean Sea at the coast of Saint Lucia. (The location of the river mouths indicated in this list. Only Roseau and Migny rivers are not on the coast.) There are 28 drainage basins for rivers of Saint Lucia.

See also
Geography of Saint Lucia
Quarters of Saint Lucia
List of cities in Saint Lucia

Notes
Breen's list of major rivers in Saint Lucia in 1844 includes a Vide Bouteille River but there is no mention of this river in the current GeoNames database.

References

 
Saint Lucia
Rivers of Saint Lucia
S